Plantago elongata is a species of plantain known by the common names prairie plantain and slender plantain.

It is native to much of western North America, from British Columbia to California and as far east as Minnesota.   It grows in wet habitat, such as vernal pools and wet meadows, including areas with saline and alkali soils, such as beaches.

Description
Plantago elongata is a petite annual herb producing a few narrow linear or threadlike basal leaves up to 10 centimeters long.

The stemlike inflorescences grow erect to a maximum height around 18 centimeters. Atop the peduncle of the inflorescence is a spike of several tiny flowers each with a rounded or oval calyx of sepals covered with thick, fleshy green bracts.

External links

Jepson Manual Treatment
Photo gallery

elongata
Flora of Western Canada
Flora of the Northwestern United States
Flora of the United States
Flora of the Southwestern United States
Flora of California
Flora of Minnesota
Flora of New Mexico
Flora of the Klamath Mountains
Flora of the Rocky Mountains
Natural history of the California chaparral and woodlands
Natural history of the California Coast Ranges
Natural history of the Central Valley (California)
Natural history of the Peninsular Ranges
Natural history of the San Francisco Bay Area
Natural history of the Transverse Ranges
Flora without expected TNC conservation status